Rahia  is a town and commune in Oum El Bouaghi Province, Algeria.

References

Communes of Oum El Bouaghi Province